Siraj-ul-Islam High School and Junior College is a primary, secondary and higher secondary school in the village of Furus, in Maharashtra, India. It is the oldest continuously operational high school in this countrified region, and one of the oldest high schools in the country. The junior college of science is the only science college located on the mainland of Furus.

Location
Siraj-ul-Islam High School and Junior College is located on the Furus to Poynar Road.  It is just 20 minutes from the Furus Bus Stop.

Courses
It offers full courses leading to the Secondary School Certificate.

See also
Ideal English School, Furus

High schools and secondary schools in Maharashtra
Junior colleges in Maharashtra
Ratnagiri district